One of The Dubliners Compilation Albums charting at #16 in the UK Albums Chart.

Track listing

Reviews

Chart performance

The Dubliners – multiple records

References

2009 greatest hits albums
The Dubliners compilation albums